The American Meme is a 2018 American documentary film that explores the lifestyle and trajectory of four social media influencers. The film was directed, produced and written by Bert Marcus, and follows  Paris Hilton, Emily Ratajkowski, DJ Khaled and Josh Ostrovsky as they work to create commercial brands out of their online presence.

The American Meme premiered at the 2018 Tribeca Film Festival, where it was acquired by Netflix. The purchase was recorded as one of the most high-profile documentary acquisitions of 2018. It was released as a Netflix Original on December 7, 2018.

Plot 
The American Meme explores the online footprint and behind the scenes stories of four social media celebrities who have each utilised online platforms to gain followers and become ‘influencers’ in the digital age.

The documentary film raises the idea of modern alienation under capitalism and explores various diverse material on the likes of Paris Hilton, Josh Ostrovsky, Brittany Furlan and Kirill Bichutsky’s rise to fame, strategies to maintain influence in social media spaces and difficulties in maintaining this influence and the use of social media as a source of income.

Cast 

 Kirill Bichutsky
 Hailey Bieber
 Amanda Cerny
 Dane Cook
 Matthew Felker
 Brittany Furlan
 Paris Hilton
 DJ Khaled
 Tommy Lee
 Josh Ostrovsky
 Emily Ratajkowski

Production 
The American Meme was directed by Bert Marcus. Bert Marcus is the founder of the production studio Bert Marcus Productions and has directed three films. The two other films are What We Started (2017) and Champs (2014).

He has been a producer on nine films in total, which include Human Capital (2019) and How to Make Money Selling Drugs (2012).

Critical reception 
The site's critical consensus reads, "The American Meme dives into the shallow end of modern celebrity, emerging with a series of fascinating – and surprisingly deep – observations." Metacritic rated it 60 points out of 100 based on seven reviews, which indicates "mixed or average reviews".

Time Out New York named it the number one film to watch in the article "The 10 best movies at Tribeca Film Festival 2018", writing that the documentary "finds its way to an unexpected sadness and maybe something deeper and cautionary." Owen Gleiberman of Variety described it as "highly entertaining and an essential snapshot of the narcotic voyeuristic parasitic American fishbowl", following its premiere at the 2018 Tribeca Film Festival. Gleiberman went on to say that , "Bert Marcus, the director of The American Meme, works in a kaleidoscopic style that channels the glitzy, fragmented screen-shot spirit of his subjects. At the same time, he gets us close to them, so that we can see the kind of people they are: shrewdly likable and kind of ordinary. Their lives consist of feeding a beast that pumps their fame and drains their souls." Bilge Ebiri of Vulture.com wrote that it "can be fun, even informative, but there’s a bigger story here, and Marcus mostly fails to tell it".

In a review of the film in The New Yorker, Naomi Fry writes, "But what is fascinating, and valuable, about The American Meme is its ability to reveal the desperation, loneliness, and sheer Sisyphean tedium of ceaselessly chasing what will most likely end up being an ever-diminishing share of the online-attention economy." The film was described by The Irish Times as "a fascinating look into the curious appeal and lives of social media superstars and reality celebrities."

Paris Hilton, one the film's central characters, has been praised for showing her vulnerability and giving audiences a glimpse into the dark side of fame. The website the Decider wrote that, "In a series of quiet, reflective interviews, Hilton explains why she trusts her fans more than her friends and dissects the risqué David LaChappelle photoshoot that transformed her into a household name." Furthermore, USA Today shares "5 ways Netflix's The American Meme will change the way you think about Paris Hilton," including the closeness she has with her fans and her genuine self-awareness about the reality of internet stardom and notoriety.

Soundtrack 
The soundtrack to The American Meme features a number of songs by artists including Britney Spears, Eminem and Ariana Grande.

Composer and songwriter Tyler Strickland is credited with selecting the pieces of music for the soundtrack in the documentary, as listed below.

References

External links

Official trailer

American documentary films
2018 documentary films
Films about social media
Netflix original documentary films
2010s English-language films
2010s American films